Old Princeton is an unincorporated community in Cass County, Illinois, United States. Old Princeton is south-southeast of Virginia.

References

Unincorporated communities in Cass County, Illinois
Unincorporated communities in Illinois